Sailing at the 2019 Pacific Games was held in Samoa from 9–19 July on the Mulifanua sailing course at the Sheraton Samoa Beach Resort at Mulifanua which is approximately 40 kilometres west of the capital, Apia. The competition schedule included men's, women's and team events. The equipment classes used were the Laser and Laser Radial dinghies, plus the Hobie 16 catamaran.

Australia and New Zealand were invited to compete at this regatta, with Australia sending a team of four sailors.

Teams
The nations competing were:

Medal summary

Medal table

Medalists

See also
 Sailing at the Pacific Games

References

External links
 

2019 Pacific Games
Pacific Games
2019
Sailing competitions in Samoa